Warwick (Milverton) railway station was a railway station in Warwickshire on the former LNWR route between Leamington Spa and Coventry. The station opened in 1844 under the name of Leamington and was the original terminus of the then single line from Coventry. In 1851 the line was extended into Leamington town centre, and joined end-on to the branch line to Rugby, and in 1854 a new station was opened on this extension called , closer to the town centre and directly alongside Leamington's GWR station (which is still in operation). Milverton station was rebuilt when the line was doubled in 1884.

The station was closed as a part of the Beeching closures in 1965, although the line remained and remains open. The station buildings have been demolished and a car dealership built over the site of the goods yard. The entrance of the original terminus station and station master's house were located north of Rugby Road on what is now the residential street The Spinney. The former location of the second and final station entrance is just west of the railway bridge on Warwick New Road, and the platforms are now an overgrown area adjacent to the footpath leading to Rugby Road.

Name changes
Milverton station was originally intended as a compromise to serve both Warwick and Leamington Spa, however it was never very successful at serving either, as it was located some distance from the centres of both towns. This was reflected in the multiple name changes throughout the station's life, detailed below:

1844	Leamington
1854	Warwick (Milverton)
1856	Warwick
1857	Warwick (Milverton)
1875	Leamington Milverton (Warwick)
1876	Milverton (for Warwick)
1884	Warwick (Milverton)
1952	Leamington Spa (Milverton) for Warwick

References

Disused railway stations in Warwickshire
Former London and North Western Railway stations
Railway stations in Great Britain opened in 1844
Railway stations in Great Britain closed in 1884
Railway stations in Great Britain opened in 1884
Railway stations in Great Britain closed in 1965
1844 establishments in England
1965 disestablishments in England
Beeching closures in England